Camallanidae is a family of nematodes belonging to the order Camallanida.

Genera
Genera:
 Camallanides Baylis & Daubney, 1922
 Camallanus Railliet & Henry, 1915
 Malayocamallanus Jothy & Fernando, 1971
 Neocamallanus Chakravarty, Majumdar & Sain, 1961
 Neocylicostrongylus Arya & Johnson, 1977
 Neoparacamallanus Bilqees & Akram, 1982
 Onchophora Diesling, 1851
 Oncophora Diesing, 1851
 Paracamallanus Yorke & Maplestone, 1926
 Platocamallanus Bilqees & Akram, 1982
 Procamallanides Khera, 1956
 Procamallanus Baylis, 1923
 Serpinema Yeh, 1960
 Spirocamallanus Olsen
 Spirocotyle Yasmin & Bilqees, 2007
 Thelazo Pearse, 1933

References

Nematodes